Gelechia jakovlevi is a moth of the family Gelechiidae. It is found in Finland, the Baltic region, Ukraine, the European part of Russia, Siberia and Mongolia.

The larvae feed on Ribes species.

References

Moths described in 1905
Gelechia
Moths of Europe